7th & I (southbound) and 8th & H (northbound) is a split light rail station on the Sacramento Regional Transit District's Gold and Green lines. It serves the Sacramento County Center. The southbound platform is located at the intersection of 7th and I Streets, while the northbound platform is located at the intersection of 8th and H Streets.

Platforms and tracks

See also
Sacramento Regional Transit District

References

Sacramento Regional Transit light rail stations
Railway stations in the United States opened in 2006